Miphy Lupini (born 20 May 1980 in Kinshasa) is football goalkeeper who last played for Golden Arrows.

Lupini moved to South Africa to play for Durban Stars F.C. in 2003. He joined Mabopane Young Masters before moving to Golden Arrows.

Lupini played for the Democratic Republic of the Congo national football team in a 2002 FIFA World Cup qualification match against Côte d'Ivoire on 29 July 2001.

References

External links
 

Living people
1980 births
Footballers from Kinshasa
Democratic Republic of the Congo footballers
Democratic Republic of the Congo international footballers
Association football goalkeepers
Durban Stars F.C. players
F.C. AK players
Lamontville Golden Arrows F.C. players
South African Premier Division players
National First Division players
Democratic Republic of the Congo expatriate footballers
Democratic Republic of the Congo expatriate sportspeople in South Africa
Expatriate soccer players in South Africa